José Antonio Colon (born 17 August 1948) is a Puerto Rican boxer. He competed in the men's light middleweight event at the 1972 Summer Olympics.

References

1948 births
Living people
Puerto Rican male boxers
Olympic boxers of Puerto Rico
Boxers at the 1972 Summer Olympics
Place of birth missing (living people)
Light-middleweight boxers